Troglomyces is a genus of fungi in the family Laboulbeniaceae which parasitize millipedes and insects.
As of 2020, it contains 9 known species: bilabiatus, botryandrus, dioicus, manfredii, pusillus, rossii, tetralabiatus, triandrus, and twitteri.

References

External links 

 Troglomyces at MycoBank
 Troglomyces at Index Fungorum

Laboulbeniomycetes
Monotypic Laboulbeniomycetes genera